François-Rodolphe de Weiss (von Weiss, also von Weiß, surname at birth Wyss) (1751–1818) was a Swiss military officer, diplomat, writer, philosopher, and a follower of Jean-Jacques Rousseau.

Life
He was born at Yverdon, son of François Rodolphe, seigneur de Daillens, and Henriette Russillon. He entered French military service in 1766, and Prussian in 1777. In 1785 he became a member of the Grand Conseil at Berne.

A supporter of the ideas of the French Revolution, de Weiss was sent to Paris as an envoy in 1792, and maintained a peace between France and the Swiss confederation. In 1794 he attributed the Revolution to ideas emanating from Geneva.

In 1798 the Bernese bailiwick at Lucens Castle was ended by a popular uprising, with Weiss defending the castle.

Weiss then went into exile, in Germany. He died by suicide at Coppet on 21 July 1818.

Works
Principes philosophiques, politiques et moraux, 2 vol. (1785). A successful work of philosophy in the style of the 18th century, translated into German and English.
Réveillez-vous Suisses, le danger approche (1798), Lyon, Imprimerie Franoy. This work was published in January 1798 during the Diet of Aarau, called to consider political reform.

Notes

1751 births
1818 deaths
People from Yverdon-les-Bains
Swiss mercenaries
18th-century Swiss military personnel
18th-century Swiss philosophers
18th-century Swiss writers
Suicides in Switzerland